Juliet Snowden is an American screenwriter, film director, and producer, best known for writing Knowing and Ouija. She is also known for co-writing screenplays with her husband Stiles White.

Career 
In 2014, Snowden wrote the screenplay for the supernatural horror film Ouija along with Stiles White, who also directed the film, based on the Hasbro's board game of the same name. The film was released on October 24, 2014 by Universal Pictures, grossing more than $102 million with a budget of just $5 million.

Future projects 
In June 2015, White and Snowden were hired by Universal to rewrite the untitled Bermuda Triangle film based on the original script by Alfred Gough and Miles Millar.

Personal life 
Snowden is married to writer-director Stiles White.

Filmography

References

External links 
 

Living people
American women screenwriters
American film producers
American film directors
Place of birth missing (living people)
Year of birth missing (living people)
American women film producers
21st-century American women